The 1969 CONCACAF Champions' Cup was the 5th edition of the annual international club football competition held in the CONCACAF region (North America, Central America and the Caribbean), the CONCACAF Champions' Cup. It determined that year's football club champion in the CONCACAF region.

The tournament was played by 10 teams of 9 nations: Netherlands Antilles, Bermuda, El Salvador, Haiti, Guatemala, Honduras, Mexico, Nicaragua, Costa Rica. It was played from 25 April till 30 September 1969 under the home/away match system and for the first time, the teams were not split into zones, playing in a straight round system.

Cruz Azul from Mexico won the final after beating Guatemalan club Comunicaaciones 1–0 in the second leg, becoming CONCACAF champion for the first time in its history.

First round

 Saprissa won 5–1 on aggregate score.

 Comunicaciones won 4–1 on aggregate score.

 Águila won 5–3 on aggregate score.

 Somerset Cricket won 6–1 on aggregate score.

Second round

 Toluca won 1–0 on aggregate score. Toluca were disqualified for the undue alignment of three players; Cruz Azul advanced.

 Comunicaciones won 7–4 on aggregate score.

 Saprissa won 7–0 on aggregate score.

Semifinal

 Cruz Azul won 4–3 on aggregate score.

Comunicaciones received a bye to the final.

Final

First leg

Second leg 

 Cruz Azul won 1–0 on aggregate score.

References

c
CONCACAF Champions' Cup
c